William Arthur MacLeod was an Anglican priest in the first half of the 20th century. He was born in Duns in 1867 and educated at Loretto School and Selwyn College, Cambridge. He was ordained in 1892 and was initially a Curate at Christ Church, Greenwich. He then held similar posts at Addington and Godalming. He was British Chaplain in St Petersburg from 1900 to 1908 and then Vicar of All Saints, South Acton until 1919 (including a spell as a Chaplain to the British Armed Forces during World War I) . He was Vicar of Wakefield from 1919 until his death; and when that church became a cathedral, its first Provost.

References

1867 births
People from Duns, Scottish Borders
People educated at Loretto School, Musselburgh
Alumni of Clare College, Cambridge
Provosts and Deans of Wakefield
1932 deaths
World War I chaplains
Royal Army Chaplains' Department officers